Vagina Dancer is the second full-length release by Canadian grindcore band Fuck the Facts.  It was released on September 30, 2000 and features the more experimental noise recordings.  At the time, Fuck the Facts consisted only of Topon Das.

Track listing

Personnel
Topon Das - All instruments

References

2000 albums
Fuck the Facts albums
Noise rock albums by Canadian artists